Maycon Cleiton de Paula Azevedo (born 8 November 1998), known as Maycon Cleiton or simply Maycon, is a Brazilian footballer who plays as a goalkeeper for Red Bull Bragantino.

Club career
Born in Cuiabá, Mato Grosso, Maycon Cleiton joined Santa Cruz's youth setup in June 2018, after representing Guarani, Jacuipense, Vitória, Bahia and Atlético Goianiense. Promoted to the main squad for the 2020 season, he made his senior debut on 18 January, starting in a 3–0 Campeonato Pernambucano home win against Petrolina.

On 3 March 2020, already established as a starter, Maycon Cleiton renewed his contract until 2023. He finished the season with 45 appearances overall, as his club narrowly missed out promotion.

On 12 February 2021, Maycon Cleiton signed a contract with Série A side Red Bull Bragantino until December 2025. He spent his first season as a third-choice behind Cleiton and Júlio César.

Career statistics

References

External links
Santa Cruz FC profile 

1998 births
Living people
People from Cuiabá
Brazilian footballers
Association football goalkeepers
Campeonato Brasileiro Série C players
Santa Cruz Futebol Clube players
Red Bull Bragantino players
Sportspeople from Mato Grosso